Cahiers pour l'Analyse was a magazine published in Paris in the 1960s. Ten issues appeared between 1966 and 1969. It was "guided by the examples of Georges Canguilhem, Jacques Lacan and Louis Althusser".

Edited by a small group of Althusser's students at the Ecole Normale Supérieure, the magazine appeared during what were – arguably – the most fertile and productive years in French philosophy during the whole of the twentieth century.

Contributors

References

External links

1966 establishments in France
1969 disestablishments in France
Defunct literary magazines published in France
Defunct political magazines published in France
French-language magazines
Magazines established in 1966
Magazines disestablished in 1969
Magazines published in Paris
Philosophy magazines
Post-structuralism
Works about postmodernism